Robert Waseige (26 August 1939 – 17 July 2019) was a Belgian football manager and player.

Career
While managing R.F.C. de Liège he helped them win the 1989–90 Belgian Cup. He became the coach of Belgium before Euro 2000 and led Belgium to the second round at the 2002 World Cup.

He then left the national team, having signed a contract with Standard Liège prior to the 2002 World Cup tournament. After a deceiving start in the Belgian First Division he was fired by the club and replaced by caretaker manager Dominique D'Onofrio. He later managed Algeria. Waseige also managed several other clubs: Winterslag, FC Liège, Lokeren, Charleroi, FC Brussels and Sporting CP in Portugal. As a player, he wore the shirts of FC Liège, RW Brussels and Winterslag. He was for some time a consultant for BeTV, a Belgian private TV channel. He died in a hospital in Liège on 17 July 2019. He was suffering from heart and kidney problems.

Honours

Player 
RW Brussels
Belgian Second Division: 1964–65

Player-manager 
KFC Winterslag
 Belgian Third Division: 1971–72

Manager 
KFC Winterslag
Belgian Second Division: 1975–76

RFC Liège
 Belgian Cup: 1989–90; runner-up 1986–87
 Belgian League Cup: 1986

Belgium
 FIFA Fair Play Trophy: 2002 World Cup

Individual 
 Belgian Professional Manager of the Year: 1984–85 (RFC Liège), 1993–94 (Charleroi), 1994–95 (Standard Liège)

References

External links
La Deux website 

1939 births
2019 deaths
Belgian footballers
RFC Liège players
R.W.D. Molenbeek players
K.R.C. Genk players
Belgian football managers
Belgian expatriate football managers
K.R.C. Genk managers
RFC Liège managers
K.S.C. Lokeren Oost-Vlaanderen managers
Standard Liège managers
R. Charleroi S.C. managers
R.W.D.M. Brussels F.C. managers
UEFA Euro 2000 managers
2002 FIFA World Cup managers
Belgium national football team managers
Expatriate football managers in Portugal
Belgian expatriates in Portugal
Algeria national football team managers
Expatriate football managers in Algeria
Association football defenders